Gary P Harrington (born 1962) is a former English international lawn bowler.

Bowls career
Harrington won a National Championship in 1993 when he won the Champion of Champions title. He also won two fours titles in 1988 and 2000.

He represented England in the fours event, at the 1990 Commonwealth Games in Auckland, New Zealand.

He bowled for Oxfordshire and Summertown BC and later Lancashire and Acton Bridge BC.

References

1962 births
Living people
English male bowls players
Bowls players at the 1990 Commonwealth Games
Commonwealth Games competitors for England